Defending champion Rafael Nadal defeated Dominic Thiem in the final, 6–4, 6–1 to win the singles tennis title at the 2017 Barcelona Open. It was his record-extending tenth Barcelona Open title.

Seeds
All seeds receive a bye into the second round.

Draw

Finals

Top half

Section 1

Section 2

Bottom half

Section 3

Section 4

Qualifying

Seeds

Qualifiers

Lucky loser

Draw

First qualifier

Second qualifier

Third qualifier

Fourth qualifier

Fifth qualifier

Sixth qualifier

References

 Main Draw
 Qualifying Draw

2017 ATP World Tour